Caroline Wozniacki was the defending champion, but she chose not to participate this year.

Lesia Tsurenko won the title, defeating Urszula Radwańska in the final 7–5, 6–1.

Seeds

Draw

Finals

Top half

Bottom half

Qualifying

Seeds

Qualifiers

Draw

First qualifier

Second qualifier

Third qualifier

Fourth qualifier

Fifth qualifier

Sixth qualifier

References
 Main Draw
 Qualifying Draw

2015 in Istanbul
2015 in Turkish tennis
Istanbul Cup - Singles
İstanbul Cup
İstanbul Cup